"När du tar mig i din famn"  (When You Take Me in Your Arms) is a song composed by Agnetha Fältskog, and lyrics by Ingela Forsman, and originally recorded by Agnetha Fältskog for her 1979 compilation album Tio år med Agnetha, released on CBS Cupol, as well as released as a single in April the same year. It charted at Svensktoppen for 10 weeks between 10 November 1979–27 January 1980, a stay which included the song topping the chart.

In 1981, Agnetha Fältskog recorded a demo version in English, entitled "The Queen of Hearts". In 1998, it was released as a single to promote the compilation album That's Me from the same year. The single peaked at #53 in the Swedish Singles Chart.

"The Queen of Hearts" was therefore licensed from Sony Music Entertainment Sweden, which had since acquired CBS Cupol, for the 1998 single release by Polar Music.

The promo single release included only the single track. One commercial release also included the song "Eyes of a Woman" from the 1985 album of the same name, and another single release included those two tracks as well as the songs "One Way Love" and "I Won't Let You Go," also from the album Eyes of a Woman.

Other recordings
The song was covered by Matz Bladhs on the 1990 albumLeende dansmusik 90 and Wizex on the 1990 album Spanska ögon. In 1997, the song was recorded by Lotta Engbergs on the album Tolv i topp while in 2008, it was recorded by Drifters on the album Tycker om dig: Svängiga låtar från förr

Getty Kaspers, former lead vocalist of the Dutch band and fellow Eurovision winners Teach-In, recorded a version of the song in Dutch, titled "De Eerste Liefde Is Een Feest" (The first love is a feast).

Charts

References

1979 songs
1998 singles
Agnetha Fältskog songs
Songs written by Agnetha Fältskog
Songs with lyrics by Ingela Forsman
Polar Music singles